Uzeyir Mammadli (born August 26, 1987, in Barda) is a youth activist and co-founder of N!DA Civic Movement. He is known for his arrest on March 30, 2013, a few days after the protests held in Baku against the non-combat deaths in the military. Mammadli is accused in preparing the riots during the protests. International human rights organization, Amnesty International recognized him as a prisoner of conscience. He was sentenced to 7 years of imprisonment on May 6, 2014, but later was pardoned and released on December 30, 2014, after 1 year 9 months imprisonment.

Education
In 2004, Mammadli was graduated from a state secondary school located in Mollalı village in Barda where he was born and grown up. In the same year, he moved to Baku to continue his education. He gained a BSc in Law degree from Baku State University in 2008. Mammadli completed his one-year compulsory military service in July 2009.

Activity
Uzeyir Mammadli is one of the young people who participated in the establishment of Nida Civic Movement. He was elected to the board of the movement for several times. At the same time, he was a representative of N!DA in the Committee for Protection of Youth Rights.

See also 
 Nida Civic Movement
 Rashadat Akhundov
 Zaur Gurbanli
 Rashad Hasanov

References 

1987 births
Living people
Azerbaijani democracy activists
Amnesty International prisoners of conscience held by Azerbaijan
Prisoners and detainees of Azerbaijan
Recipients of Azerbaijani presidential pardons
Baku State University alumni